Rhabdadenia is a genus of plant in the family Apocynaceae first described as a genus in 1860. It is native to South America, Central America, southern Mexico, the West Indies, and Florida.

Species
 Rhabdadenia biflora (Jacq.) Müll.Arg. - widespread from Florida and southern Mexico to Brazil
 Rhabdadenia madida (Vell.) Miers - South America from Colombia + the Guianas to Uruguay + Bolivia
 Rhabdadenia ragonesei Woodson - Mato Grosso do Sul, Paraguay, N Argentina

formerly included in the genus
 Rhabdadenia barbata (Desv. ex Ham.) Miers = Pentalinon luteum (L.) B.F.Hansen & Wunderlin
 Rhabdadenia berteroi (A.DC.) Müll.Arg. = Angadenia berteroi (A.DC.) Miers
 Rhabdadenia campestris (Vell.) Miers = Mandevilla hirsuta (Rich.) K.Schum. 
 Rhabdadenia corallicola Small = Angadenia berteroi (A.DC.) Miers
 Rhabdadenia cubensis Müll.Arg. = Angadenia berteroi (A.DC.) Miers
 Rhabdadenia laxiflora Miers = Pentalinon luteum (L.) B.F.Hansen & Wunderlin
 Rhabdadenia lindeniana Müll.Arg. = Angadenia lindeniana (Müll.Arg.) Miers
 Rhabdadenia lucida Miers = Odontadenia nitida (Vahl) Müll.Arg. 
 Rhabdadenia polyneura Urb = Odontadenia polyneura (Urb.) Woodson
 Rhabdadenia sagrae (A.DC.) Müll.Arg. ex Griseb. = Angadenia berteroi (A.DC.) Miers
 Rhabdadenia wrightiana Müll.Arg. = Neobracea valenzuelana (A.Rich.) Urb.

References

 
Apocynaceae genera